Clausula may refer to:

Clausula (music)
Clausula (rhetoric)